Harrismith Airport  is a small airfield near 42nd Hill in Free State, South Africa. It is located in Harrismith, halfway between Johannesburg and Durban. No commercial flights operating in or out of  Harrismith and caters only for general aviation. It is along the N3 road and near the N5 road.

Nearby places
Sterkfontein Dam
Swinburne, Free State

See also
Thabo Mofutsanyana District Municipality

References

Airports in South Africa
Transport in the Free State (province)
Maluti-a-Phofung